The Standing Committee on Foreign Affairs and Defence is a standing committee of the Parliament of Norway. It is responsible for policies relating foreign affairs, military, development cooperation, Svalbard or in other polar regions and matters in general relating to agreements between Norway and other states or organizations. It corresponds to the Ministry of Foreign Affairs and the Ministry of Defence. The committee has 16 members and is chaired by Ine Eriksen Søreide  of the Conservative Party. The members also sit on the Enlarged Committee on Foreign Affairs and the European Committee.

Members 2021–25

Leadership
The committee is headed by a chair and two vice chairs. 

Key

Chairs

Vice Chairs

First Vice Chairs

Second Vice Chairs

References

Standing committees of the Storting